Peperomia guayaquilensis is a species of plant in the family Piperaceae. It is endemic to Ecuador.

References

Flora of Ecuador
guayaquilensis
Critically endangered plants
Taxonomy articles created by Polbot